Johnedel Cardel (born June 6, 1970) is a Filipino former professional basketball player who played in the Philippine Basketball Association from 1993–1997. He is the current head coach of the Terrafirma Dyip. He also played in the Metropolitan Basketball Association.

Collegiate / Amateur career
Cardel first played for the Jose Rizal College Light Bombers in the NCAA during his high school days and was a reliever on the San Sebastian team in College. He became one of the more popular players playing for De La Salle Green Archers in the Ateneo-La Salle UAAP championship in 1988. Cardel was a member of the back-to-back UAAP champion De La Salle in 1989–1990. 

He also saw action for the national team, first in the ABC 17-and-under team in Doha, Qatar, then he played for the RP Youth team in the ABC Youth cagefest in Manila in January 1989 and finally with the men's national team for the SEA Games and ABC Championships that same year.

Together with Green Archer teammate Jun Limpot, they played for Magnolia Ice Cream in the Philippine Basketball League and winning numerous championships.

PBA / MBA career
Cardel turn pro in 1993 and was drafted by Alaska Milk as the sixth overall pick. He won one championship with Alaska in 1994 PBA Governors Cup. He moved to Sta. Lucia Realtors in the next two seasons before playing for Formula Shell in his final PBA year in 1997. He signed up with the Negros Slashers in the MBA in their inaugural season. Cardel helped the Slashers to three Southern Conference titles (1998, 2000 and 2001) but was unable to lead them to the overall MBA championship during his stay. In 2002 he signed up with the Olongapo Volunteers but was unable to finish the season due to the league shutdown.

References

External links
New Dyip head coach Cardel sets modest goals for Govs' Cup@ABS-CBN Sports

1970 births
Living people
Alaska Aces (PBA) players
Basketball players from Metro Manila
Filipino men's basketball coaches
Filipino men's basketball players
People from Mandaluyong
NorthPort Batang Pier coaches
Philippines men's national basketball team players
San Sebastian Stags basketball players
Shell Turbo Chargers players
Shooting guards
Sta. Lucia Realtors players
De La Salle Green Archers basketball players
Alaska Aces (PBA) draft picks
Terrafirma Dyip coaches